Bundesstraße 84 or B84 is a federal road in Lower Saxony, Germany. It connects Hünfeld in Hesse via Eisenach with Ebeleben in Thuringia.  It comes off of the B4, which is located west of Dedelstorf towards the east. It then goes through: Wittingen, Brome, Rühen, Velpke, Helmstedt, Schöningen, Dardesheim and Wernigerode, finishing at Elbingerode, culminating at the B 27.

See also 
List of federal highways in Germany
Via Regia

References

External links 
 Bundesstraßenverzeichnis (List of federal roads), Ausgabe 2009 (BVERZ 2009), Bundesanstalt für Straßenwesen (Federal Highway Research Institute) (in German)

084
Roads in Hesse
Roads in Thuringia